Antrim Borough was a borough constituency which elected two MPs to the Irish House of Commons, the house of representatives of the Kingdom of Ireland.

History
The borough of Antrim in County Antrim was enfranchised as a borough constituency in 1666. In the Patriot Parliament of 1689 summoned by King James II, Antrim was not represented. Thereafter it continued to be entitled to send two Members of Parliament to the Irish House of Commons until the Parliament of Ireland was merged into the Parliament of the United Kingdom on 1 January 1801. The constituency was disenfranchised on 31 December 1800 by the Acts of Union 1800.

The borough was represented in the House of Commons of the United Kingdom as part of the county constituency of Antrim.

Electoral System and Electorate
The parliamentary representatives for all constituencies in the Irish House of Commons were elected using the bloc vote for two-member elections and first past the post for single-member by-elections.

The borough had a Potwalloper electorate.

Members of Parliament, 1666–1801

References

Bibliography

Antrim, County Antrim
Constituencies of the Parliament of Ireland (pre-1801)
Historic constituencies in County Antrim
1666 establishments in Ireland
1800 disestablishments in Ireland
Constituencies established in 1666
Constituencies disestablished in 1800